Animals is the title of a performance by British comedian Ricky Gervais. It was filmed at the Bloomsbury Theatre, London, United Kingdom in 2003.

External links

2003 films
2003 comedy films
British comedy films
Stand-up comedy concert films
Stand-up comedy on DVD
Ricky Gervais
2000s British films